The 2018–19 EML season (also known as the Coolbet Hokiliiga for sponsorship reasons) was the 79th season of the Meistriliiga, the top level of ice hockey in Estonia. The season began on 29 September 2018.

Teams

Championship

League table

Cup

Bracket

References

External links
Official website

Estonia
2018 in Estonian sport
2019 in Estonian sport
Meistriliiga (ice hockey) seasons